This article shows statistics of individual players for the football club Dinamo Zagreb It also lists all matches that Dinamo Zagreb played in the 2002–03 season.

Squad
(Correct as of November 2002)

Competitions

Overall

Prva HNL

Classification

Results summary

Results by round

Results by opponent

Source: 2002–03 Prva HNL article

Matches

Competitive

Last updated 4 May 2002Sources:

External links
 2002–03 in Croatian Football at Rec.Sport.Soccer Statistics Foundation
 2002–03 season at Prva HNL official website 
 Dinamo Zagreb Official website 

GNK Dinamo Zagreb seasons
Dinamo Zagreb
Croatian football championship-winning seasons